Andres Cuero (born July 8, 1989) is an American soccer player who played for Austin Aztex in the USL Pro.

Career

College and Amateur
Cuero played his college soccer at the University of North Carolina at Charlotte, where he was third-team NSCAA All-Mid-Atlantic Region Honors and earned All-Tournament honors after leading the 49ers to tournament titles in the Davidson/Adidas Classic.

During his college career, Cuero played with USL Premier Development League club Austin Aztex U23 during their 2008 and 2009 seasons, and with th DFW Tornados in 2010.

Professional
Cuero signed his first professional contract in February 2011, joining USL Pro club Wilmington Hammerheads. He made his professional debut on April 17, 2011, in Wilmington's first game of the 2011 season, a 1–0 win over the Rochester Rhinos, and scored his first professional goal on June 4 in a 4–2 loss to Orlando City.

Cuero re-signed with Wilmington for the 2012 season on December 5, 2011.

References

External links
 49ers profile

1989 births
Living people
American soccer players
Charlotte 49ers men's soccer players
Austin Aztex U23 players
DFW Tornados players
Wilmington Hammerheads FC players
Austin Aztex players
USL League Two players
Soccer players from Texas
Association football forwards
USL Championship players